Jestřebí is a municipality and village in Česká Lípa District in the Liberec Region of the Czech Republic. It has about 800 inhabitants.

Administrative parts

Villages of Pavlovice and Újezd are administrative parts of Jestřebí.

References

Villages in Česká Lípa District